Fushun County is a county in the south-central part of Sichuan Province, China. It is the easternmost county-level division of prefecture-level city of Zigong.

History
Fushun has a history over 1400 years. The county was built in 567 BC during the Southern and Northern Dynasties of China.

Geography

Population
In 2006, the county had a population of 1,034,600.

Climate

See also
Zigong

References

External links
 Fushun Government website

 
County-level divisions of Sichuan
Zigong